Bandar pascoei is a species of longhorn beetle native to Asia with a wide range of distribution. The species is a delicacy in Thailand.

The species can be found from India and Sri Lanka, through China and Indo-China to Borneo and Java

The host plants of the larva include: Castanea mollissima, Diospyros kaki, Malus pumila, Pistacia chinensis, Prunus armeniaca, Prunus persica, Pyrus serotina and Quercus variabilis.

References 

Cerambycinae
Insects of Sri Lanka
Insects of India
Insects of Afghanistan
Insects of Pakistan
Insects of Nepal
Insects of Myanmar
Insects of Laos
Insects described in 1884